Stuart River may refer to:

Stuart River (Queensland), a river located in the Wide Bay–Burnett region of Queensland, Australia
Stuart River (Canada), a river located in northeastern British Columbia, Canada
Stuart River (Minnesota), a river located in Minnesota, United States

See also
Stewart River (disambiguation)